People is an American weekly magazine that specializes in celebrity news and human-interest stories. It is published by Dotdash Meredith, a subsidiary of IAC. With a readership of 46.6 million adults in 2009, People had the largest audience of any American magazine, but it fell to second place in 2018 after its readership significantly declined to 35.9 million. People had $997 million in advertising revenue in 2011, the highest advertising revenue of any American magazine. In 2006, it had a circulation of 3.75 million and revenue expected to top $1.5 billion. It was named "Magazine of the Year" by Advertising Age in October 2005, for excellence in editorial, circulation, and advertising. People ranked number 6 on Advertising Ages annual "A-list" and number 3 on Adweeks "Brand Blazers" list in October 2006.

Peoples website, People.com, focuses on celebrity news and human interest stories.

People is perhaps best known for its yearly special issues naming the "World's Most Beautiful", "Best & Worst Dressed", and "Sexiest Man Alive". The magazine's headquarters are in New York City, and it maintains editorial bureaus in Los Angeles and in London. For economic reasons, it closed bureaus in Austin, Miami, and Chicago in 2006.

History
Andrew Heiskell, who was the chief executive officer of Time Inc. at the time and the former publisher of the weekly Life magazine, is credited with coming up with the idea for People. The founding managing editor of People was Richard Stolley, a former assistant managing editor at Life and the journalist who acquired the Zapruder film of the John F. Kennedy assassination for Time Inc. in 1963. Peoples first publisher was Richard J. "Dick" Durrell, another Time Inc. veteran.

Stolley characterized the magazine as "getting back to the people who are causing the news and who are caught up in it, or deserve to be in it. Our focus is on people, not issues." Stolley's almost religious determination to keep the magazine people-focused contributed significantly to its rapid early success. It is said that although Time Inc. pumped an estimated $40 million into the venture, the magazine only broke even 18 months after its debut on February 25, 1974. Initially, the magazine was sold primarily on newsstands and in supermarkets. To get the magazine out each week, founding staff members regularly slept on the floor of their offices two or three nights each week and severely limited all non-essential outside engagements. The premiere edition for the week ending March 4, 1974, featured actress Mia Farrow, then starring in the film The Great Gatsby, on the cover. That issue also featured stories on Gloria Vanderbilt, Aleksandr Solzhenitsyn and the wives of U.S. Vietnam veterans who were Missing In Action. The magazine was, apart from its cover, printed in black-and-white. The initial cover price was 35 cents.

The core of the small founding editorial team included other editors, writers, photographers and photo editors from Life magazine, which had ceased publication just 13 months earlier. This group included managing editor Stolley, senior editors Hal Wingo (father of ESPN anchor Trey Wingo), Sam Angeloff (the founding managing editor of Us magazine) and Robert Emmett Ginna, Jr. (a former Life writer and also a film and television producer); writers James Watters (a theater reviewer) and Ronald B. Scott (later a biographer of Presidential candidate Mitt Romney); former Time senior editor Richard Burgheim (later the founder of Times ill-fated cable television magazine View); Chief of Photography, a Life photographer, John Loengard, to be succeeded by John Dominus, a noteworthy Life staff photographer; and design artist Bernard Waber, author, and illustrator of the Lyle The Crocodile book series for children. Many of the noteworthy Life photographers contributed to the magazine as well, including legends Alfred Eisenstaedt and Gjon Mili and rising stars Co Rentmeester, David Burnett and Bill Eppridge. Other members of the first editorial staff included editors and writers Ross Drake, Ralph Novak, Bina Bernard, James Jerome, Sally Moore, Mary Vespa, Lee Wohlfert, Joyce Wansley, Curt Davis, Clare Crawford-Mason, and Jed Horne, later an editor of The Times-Picayune in New Orleans.

In 1996, Time Inc. launched a Spanish-language magazine entitled People en Español. The company has said that the new publication emerged after a 1995 issue of the original magazine was distributed with two distinct covers, one featuring the murdered Tejano singer Selena and the other featuring the hit television series Friends; the Selena cover sold out while the other did not. Although the original idea was that Spanish-language translations of articles from the English magazine would comprise half the content, People en Español over time came to have entirely original content.

In 2002, People introduced People Stylewatch, a title focusing on celebrity style, fashion, and beauty – a newsstand extension of its Stylewatch column. Due to its success, the frequency of People Stylewatch was increased to 10 times per year in 2007. In spring 2017, People Stylewatch was rebranded as PeopleStyle. In late 2017, it was announced that there would no longer be a print version of PeopleStyle and it would be a digital-only publication.

In Australia, the localized version of People is titled Who since there was already another magazine published under the title People. The international edition of People has been published in Greece since 2010.

On July 26, 2013, Outlook Group announced that it was closing down the Indian edition of People, which began publication in 2008.

In September 2016, in collaboration with Entertainment Weekly, People launched the People/Entertainment Weekly Network. The "free, ad-supported online-video network... covering celebrities, pop culture, lifestyle and human-interest stories", was rebranded as PeopleTV in September 2017.

In December 2016, LaTavia Roberson engaged in a feud with People after alleging they misquoted and misrepresented her interview online.

Meredith purchased Time Inc., including People, in 2017. In 2019, People editor Jess Cagle announced he was stepping down from his role. It was later announced he would be replaced by deputy editor Dan Wakeford, who previously worked for In Touch Weekly. Liz Vaccariello was named the new Editor in Chief on February 23, 2022, replacing Dan Wakeford.

On October 6, 2021, Dotdash purchased People, including Entertainment Weekly, InStyle, and Chip and Joanna Gaines' Magnolia Journal in a $2.7 billion deal.

Teen People

In 1998, the magazine introduced a version targeted at teens, called Teen People. However, on July 27, 2006, the company announced that it would shut down publication of Teen People immediately. The last issue to be released was scheduled for September 2006.  In exchange, subscribers to this magazine received Entertainment Weekly for the rest of their subscriptions. There were numerous reasons cited for the publication shutdown, including a downfall in ad pages, competition from both other teen-oriented magazines and the internet, and a decrease in circulation numbers. Teenpeople.com was merged into People.com in April 2007. People.com will "carry teen-focused stories that are branded as TeenPeople.com," Mark Golin, the editor of People.com explained. On the decision to merge the brands, he stated, "We've got traffic on TeenPeople, People is a larger site, why not combine and have the teen traffic going to one place?"

Competition for celebrity photos
In a July 2006 Variety article, Janice Min, Us Weekly editor-in-chief, blamed People for the increase in cost to publishers of celebrity photos:

People reportedly paid $4.1 million for photos of newborn Shiloh Nouvel Jolie-Pitt, the child of Angelina Jolie and Brad Pitt. The photos set a single-day traffic record for their website, attracting 26.5 million page views.

Sexiest Man Alive
The annual feature the "Sexiest Man Alive" is billed as a benchmark of male attractiveness and typically includes only famous people. It is determined using a procedure similar to the procedure used for Times Person of the Year. The origin of the title was a discussion on a planned story on Mel Gibson. Someone exclaimed, "Oh my God, he is the sexiest man alive!" And someone else said, "You should use that as a cover line."

For the first decade or so, the feature appeared at uneven intervals. Originally awarded in the wintertime, it shifted around the calendar, resulting in gaps as short as seven months and as long as a year and a half, with no selection at all during 1994 (21 years later the magazine did select Keanu Reeves to fill the 1994 gap, with runners-up including Hugh Grant and Jim Carrey). Since 1997, the dates have settled between mid-November and early December.

Dates of magazine issues, winners, ages of winners at the time of selection, and pertinent comments are listed below.

, former winners John F. Kennedy Jr., Sean Connery, and Patrick Swayze have since died. Kennedy Jr. and David Beckham are the only non-entertainers to have won the accolade.

Sexiest Woman Alive

In December 2014, People selected its first and only Sexiest Woman Alive, Kate Upton.
Cindy Crawford and Richard Gere were declared "Sexiest Couple of the Year" on October 19, 1993.

Cutest Baby Alive
In 2019, People selected its first Cutest Baby Alive, Andy Cohen's son Benjamin. In 2020, Anderson Cooper's son, Wyatt Morgan was named the Cutest Baby Alive.

Most Intriguing People of the Year
At the end of each year People magazine famously selects 25 news-making individuals or couples who have received a lot of media attention over the past 12 months and showcases them in a special year-end issue, the '25 Most Intriguing People of the Year'. This series of full-page features and half-page featurettes includes world leaders and political activists, famous actors and entertainers, elite athletes, prominent business people, accomplished scientists and occasionally members of the public whose stories have made an unusual impact in news or tabloid media.

100 Most Beautiful People
Peoples 100 Most Beautiful People is an annual list of 100 people judged to be the most beautiful individuals in the world. Until 2006, it was the 50 Most Beautiful People.

Julia Roberts holds the record for most times named, with five.  Michelle Pfeiffer, Jennifer Aniston, and Kate Hudson have appeared twice.

In 2020, Goldie Hawn, Kate Hudson, and Hudson's daughter Rani made history becoming the first multigenerational cover stars of the Beautiful Issue. In addition, Hawn and her granddaughter concurrently became the oldest and youngest to cover the Beautiful Issue.

Number Ones of Most Beautiful People

People Magazine Yearbook 
People Magazine Yearbook is an annual publication released by publishers of People Magazine, currently Meredith Corporation. The Yearbook broadly covers all the major events that happened in the year that it covers. This includes socially relevant news events that made headlines around the world in general but more specifically in the United States. Besides the news headlines, it covers celebrity weddings, splits/divorces, births and deaths, and also scandalous events that generated a lot of news when they happened. Over the years, it has covered headlining events in the world of Music (Grammy Awards), Movies (Oscar Awards, The Golden Globe Awards), and Television (Emmy Awards) in a bite sized recap of the event and the award winners. The People Yearbook has had the year (say, 2010) written in Bold accompanying the word "Yearbook" on the front cover since the People Yearbook 1995, although this gradually changed in the more recent editions. Since 2015, the "year" appeared in a more inconspicuous way on the front cover until the 2019 issue and the bold style of writing the "year" made a comeback in the 2020 issue. The Year also appears on the spine.

Early Years 
The People Magazine Yearbook was first published in the Year 1991 by The Time Inc. Magazine Company and it was called "Private Lives". This issue did not mention any year conspicuously on the front page or the inner page but the front flap of the hardcover version of the magazine described Private Lives as "People's chronicle of an extraordinary year - 1990", clearly describing that the events covered inside were from 1990. Next Year, the 1992 sequel to Private Lives was published and it was called "Private Lives Volume II". The first page had an additional tagline that described the magazine as The Year in Review: 1991 Private Lives. In 1993, there was another change in the publication and also its cover title. The year was added on the cover for the first time and this annual issue was called "Private Lives 1993". The "Year" appeared in Bold on the front cover. The first page described the publication as Private Lives The Year in Review: 1992. Next year, in 1994, People Books released Private Lives 1994 with the first page that said Private Lives Year in Review: 1993. The year 1996 ushered in the single biggest change in the magazine title. The title was reworked and found a new moniker - It was called "People Yearbook 1995". Previous title of "Private Lives" was dropped completely and the publication was defined as a "yearbook" for the first time.

Changes over the Years 
In all the years since its inception, People Magazine Yearbook has covered events from the previous year and not the year on the front cover, and this is true even from the time period when it was called Private Lives. For example, People Magazine Yearbook 2008 covered events of 2007. And People Magazine Yearbook 1998 covered the events of the Year 1997. 2014 was the last year for this to happen. The 2014 yearbook covered events of 2013. In 2015, a shift happened in the magazine that changed for the first time the year it actually covered within its pages. Instead of covering the events of 2014, this issue covered the events of 2015 and arrived on the stands towards the end of 2015. To make the shift properly understood, the first page of this yearbook included a tagline "The Most Memorable Moments of 2015". With this move, People Magazine Yearbook changed its own 25-year-old tradition. This shift, however, resulted in the year 2014 never being covered by the People Magazine Yearbook and 2014 became the only year not to be covered since its inception in 1991. Since then, the People Magazine Yearbook has been covering events of the same year that are on the Front Page. Another typeface change was experimented for two years when People Magazine Yearbook 2013! and People Magazine Yearbook 2014! had an exclamation mark following the year. This was dropped in the 2015 Yearbook and the publication discarded the exclamation mark. However, this issue dropped the Bold writing of the "Year" on the front cover and replaced it with a more inconspicuous style and it was like that until the 2019 issue. The 2016 Yearbook was a special "flip cover" issue wherein it combined a special edition memorabilia to cherish the memories of people that died in 2016. The list included Prince, David Bowie, Nancy Reagan, Alan Rickman, Doris Roberts, Muhammad Ali etc. The special edition could be accessed by flipping over the magazine. In November 2017, Meredith Corporation announced that it would acquire Time Inc. for $2.8 billion. The acquisition was completed on January 31, 2018. Time Magazine, People Magazine and also People Magazine Yearbook are now published by Meredith Corporation. The copyright of the 2018 Yearbook was described as belonging to Time Inc. Books, a division of Meredith Corporation and published by People Books, an imprint of Time Books. This issue included the tagline, "The Most Memorable Moments of 2018" on the cover. However, in the 2019 Yearbook, the copyright was described as belonging to Meredith Corporation, without any prominent tagline. The prominent bold writing of the "Year" on the front cover made a comeback with the 2020 Yearbook, along with a tagline saying "Our Extraordinary Year Together". The trend continued with the 2021 Yearbook, along with a tagline saying, "When We All Got Together Again".

Television spinoffs
The magazine has inspired the television series People Magazine Investigates, a true crime series which debuted in 2016 on Investigation Discovery, and People Puzzler, a crossword puzzle-themed game show which debuted in 2021 on Game Show Network.

See also 
 People's Magazine

References

External links

 
IAC (company)
Weekly magazines published in the United States
Celebrity magazines published in the United States
Magazines established in 1974
Magazines published in New York City